Rasch is a surname of German origin, which meant a person who was quick or rash, from the Middle High German rasch, meaning "quick", "hot-headed" or "hasty". An alternative meaning is as a locational surname for a person from a village called Rasch in Franconia, Germany. The name may refer to: 

Albertina Rasch (1891–1967), American dancer and choreographer
Anthony Rasch (1778-1858), German-American silversmith
Bent Peder Rasch (1934–1988), Danish sprint canoeist
Bjørn Ole Rasch (born 1959), Norwegian musician
Carl L. Rasch (1866–1961), American judge
Carlos Rasch (born 1932), German writer
Carne Rasch (1847–1914), British politician
Gabriel Rasch (born 1976), Norwegian cyclist
Georg Rasch (1901–1980), Danish mathematician
Halvor Heyerdahl Rasch (1805–1883), Norwegian zoologist
Hermann Rasch (1914–1974), German U-boat commander
Johan Lauritz Rasch (1829–1901), Norwegian politician
Lars Rasch (1797–1864), Norwegian politician
Lilo Rasch-Naegele (1914–1978), German artist
Mahmoud Bodo Rasch (born 1943), German architect
Otto Rasch (1891–1948), German Nazi official
Raymond Rasch (1917–1964), American musician
Stian Rasch (born 1987), Norwegian footballer
Torsten Rasch (born 1965), German musician

See also
Raasch
Rasch Baronets
Rasch model
Rasch model estimation
Polytomous Rasch model
 Rasche
 Raiche (disambiguation)

References 

German-language surnames
Danish-language surnames
Norwegian-language surnames
Surnames from nicknames